Nicolas Freeling (born Nicolas Davidson; 3 March 1927 – 20 July 2003), was a British crime novelist, best known as the author of the "Van der Valk" series of detective novels.  A television series based on the character was produced for the British ITV network by Thames Television during the 1970s, and revived in 1991–92 and again in 2020.

Biography
Freeling was born in London, but travelled widely, and ended his life at his long-standing home at Grandfontaine to the west of Strasbourg.  He had followed a variety of occupations, including the armed services and the catering profession.  He began writing during a three-week prison sentence, after being convicted of taking home some veal from a restaurant where he worked, though that was common practice in the restaurant trade.

Freeling got bored with writing about his Amsterdam detective Van der Valk and killed him off in 1972, when he was shot while following up a rather unpromising lead. Freeling refused to bring the detective back to life and wrote two novels in which his widow Arlette is the detective. Then he started his second detective series, about a French police inspector, Henri Castang to revive his failing income. Some have considered Castang superior to Van der Valk.

Freeling's The King of the Rainy Country received a 1967 Edgar Award, from the Mystery Writers of America, for Best Novel.

Gun Before Butter won France's Grand Prix de Littérature Policière and was a runner up for the UK Crime Writers' Association's 1963 Gold Dagger Award.

In 1968 Freeling's novel Love in Amsterdam was adapted as the film Amsterdam Affair directed by Gerry O'Hara and starring Wolfgang Kieling as Van Der Valk.

A radio drama of his Henri Castang novel "The Night Lords" adapted by Michael Bakewell was made in 1990 starring Keith Barron, Richard Vernon, and Edita Brychta as part of the BBC Radio 4 Saturday Night Theatre series.

Works

Novels

Van der Valk series
 Love in Amsterdam (1962),  Death in Amsterdam
In an eccentric piece of police procedure, Van der Valk involves narrator Martin Roy in investigating the death of his ex-lover Elsa de Charmoy, a promiscuous and manipulative potter.
 Because of the Cats (1963) 
 Gun Before Butter (1963), a.k.a. Question of Loyalty
 Double-Barrel (1964)
 Criminal Conversation (1965)
 The King of the Rainy Country (1966)
Van der Valk is asked to discreetly trace Jean-Claude Marschal, the disappeared heir to a business fortune, and follows him to Innsbruck, Strasbourg and a village in the Vosges, benefitting from the cooperation of German, Austrian and French police colleagues. He discovers Marschal dead in a suicide pact reminiscent of the Mayerling incident. He then tracks Marschal's wife Anne-Marie to Biarritz and the Spanish border, where, despite having previously tried to seduce him, she shoots him.
 Strike Out Where Not Applicable (1967)
 Tsing-Boum! (1969)
 Over the High Side (1971), a.k.a. The Lovely Ladies
 A Long Silence (1972), a.k.a. Auprès de ma Blonde
 Sand Castles (1989)

Adaptations

Television
Created by Freeling, the British television crime drama series Van der Valk is an adaptation of the novels. It first ran from 1972 to 1992, followed by the remake in 2020–present.

Film
 Amsterdam Affair (1968), a lesser-known British film, with German actor Wolfgang Kieling in the title role.
 Pas de frontières pour l'inspecteur (Van der Valk), three French-West German co-produced TV films, starring Frank Finlay in the title role:
 Van der Valk und das Mädchen (Le milieu n'est pas tendre) (1972), based on the novel Gun Before Butter, directed by Peter Zadek.
  (Discrétion absolue) (1973), directed by Wolfgang Petersen.
 Van der Valk und die Toten (Le bouc émissaire) (1975), directed by Marcel Cravenne.
 Because of the Cats (1973), a Dutch/Belgian co-production, starring British actor Bryan Marshall in the title role.

Radio
Adapted for BBC Radio:

 Gun Before Butter (1993) - Starring Ian Hogg as Van der Valk and Sophie Thompson as Lucienne.
 King of the Rainy Country (1994) - Starring Martin Jarvis as Van der Valk.
 Arlette and The Widow (1999) - Starring Stella Gonet as Arlette Van der Valk and Nigel Anthony as Piet Van der Valk.

Featuring Arlette Van der Valk
 The Widow (1979)
 One Damn Thing After Another (1981), a.k.a. Arlette

Henri Castang series
 Dressing of Diamond (1974)
 What are the Bugles Blowing For? (1975), a.k.a. The Bugles Blowing
 Lake Isle (1976), a.k.a. Sabine
 The Night Lords (1978) 
 Castang's City (1980) 
 Wolfnight (1982) 
 The Back of the North Wind (1983) 
 No Part in Your Death (1984)
 Cold Iron (1986)
 Lady Macbeth (1988)
 Not as Far as Velma (1989)
 Those in Peril (1990)
 Flanders Sky (1992), a.k.a. The Pretty How Town
 You Who Know (1994) 
 The Seacoast of Bohemia (1994)
 A Dwarf Kingdom (1996)

In 1990 Not as Far as Velma was adapted as a six-part BBC Radio serial starring Keith Barron as Castang.

Other novels
 Valparaiso (1964, 1. edition as by F. R. E. Nicolas)
 The Dresden Green (1966)
 This is the Castle (1968)
 Gadget (1977) 
 A City Solitary (1984) 
 One More River (1998)
 Some Day Tomorrow (1999) 
 The Janeites (2002)

Non-fiction
 The Kitchen (1970)
 Cook Book (1972)
 Criminal Convictions (1994)
 The Village Book (2001) 
 The Kitchen and the Cook (2002)

References

External links 
 Freeling's obituary in The Daily Telegraph
 Freeling's obituary in The Guardian

1927 births
2003 deaths
English crime fiction writers
Edgar Award winners
English male novelists
20th-century English novelists
20th-century English male writers